Charles Brandt is an American former investigator, writer, and speaker. He wrote Frank Sheeran's memoir I Heard You Paint Houses,  the basis for the 2019 film The Irishman, directed by Martin Scorsese and starring Robert De Niro, Al Pacino and Joe Pesci.

Books  
 
 
  
 
 Suppressing the Truth in Dallas: Conspiracy, Cover-Up, and International Complications in the JFK Assassination Case (2022)

References 

Living people
Organized crime novelists
Organized crime memoirists
Non-fiction writers about organized crime in the United States
People from Brooklyn
Male novelists
American male non-fiction writers
Year of birth missing (living people)